The Hundred Flowers Award for Best Supporting Actor was first awarded by the China Film Association in 1962.

Award winners

1960s

1980–2004

Since 2006

Records

References

Supporting Actor
Film awards for supporting actor